Biernacice  is a village in the administrative district of Gmina Wartkowice, within Poddębice County, Łódź Voivodeship, in central Poland.

References

Villages in Poddębice County
Kalisz Governorate
Łódź Voivodeship (1919–1939)
Poznań Voivodeship (1921–1939)